She Wants Me is a 2012 comedy film written and directed by Rob Margolies and starring Josh Gad and Kristen Ruhlin.

Plot 
Sam is a writer working on a feature film. His girlfriend Sammy has been promised the lead role, but the producers want a famous actress. After some problems and the return of Sammy’s ex-boyfriend John, the relationship get complicated and they break up. Sam needs to deal with John, who becomes his friend and roommate, his lack of inspiration to write the film, his new single life and a new girlfriend who has had sex with many men, though all he really wants is Sammy back.

Cast

Casting 

Margolies originally penned the role of Sam Baum for Jonah Hill, and intended Elliot Page to play Sammy Kingston. Kate Bosworth was originally attached to play the role of Kim Powers, but due to scheduling conflicts with another film, was unable to participate. Hilary Duff replaced her in October 2010.

The cameo role of Charlie Sheen was penned originally for Jeff Goldblum, but when the producers of the film mentioned an option to have Sheen participate, Margolies jumped at the chance to work with him. Sheen eventually became one of the executive producers of the film.

References

External links

2012 films
American comedy films
2012 comedy films
2010s English-language films
2010s American films